Juwan Johnson (born September 13, 1996) is an American football tight end for the New Orleans Saints of the National Football League (NFL). He played college football at Penn State and Oregon and signed with the Saints as an undrafted free agent in 2020.

Early years
Born in Stratford, New Jersey, Johnson was raised in Glassboro, New Jersey and played prep football at Glassboro High School.

College career
Johnson played college football at Penn State from 2015 to 2018 before transferring to Oregon for his senior year.

Professional career

Johnson signed with the New Orleans Saints as an undrafted free agent following the 2020 NFL Draft on April 27, 2020. He was waived during final roster cuts on September 5, 2020, and signed to the team's practice squad the next day. He was elevated to the active roster on October 24, October 31, December 5, and December 12 for the team's weeks 7, 8, 13, and 14 games against the Carolina Panthers, Chicago Bears, Atlanta Falcons, and Philadelphia Eagles, and reverted to the practice squad after each game. He was signed to the active roster on December 19, 2020.

On March 11, 2023, Johnson signed a two-year contract extension with the New Orleans Saints.

References

External links
 New Orleans Saints bio
 Oregon Ducks bio

1996 births
Living people
Glassboro High School alumni
People from Glassboro, New Jersey
People from Stratford, New Jersey
Players of American football from New Jersey
American football tight ends
American football wide receivers
Penn State Nittany Lions football players
Oregon Ducks football players
New Orleans Saints players
Sportspeople from Gloucester County, New Jersey